MV Hrossey is a NorthLink Ferries vehicle and passenger ferry based in Aberdeen. With her sister ship, she operates a daily ferry service between mainland Scotland and the northern archipelagos of Orkney and Shetland.

History
MV Hrossey and her sister ship, were constructed in 2002 at Aker Finnyards in Finland.

In 2013 following Serco being awarded the NorthLink ferries contract MV Hrossey had some changes as part of the rebranding, such as new “sleeping pods” and a new paint job.

Layout
MV Hrossey carries passengers, cars, freight and livestock. There is a choice of restaurants, bars and lounges, children's play area and a cinema. The restaurants and lounges have a total seating capacity of 600. The original 100 cabins had a total of 300 beds. All cabins are en-suite, most being two berth, with a number of four-berth cabins for families. In April 2007, an additional accommodation module was fitted at Cammell Laird in Birkenhead, increasing her capacity to 356 berths. The ship is fitted with lifts and was built to accommodate disabled passengers throughout. There are 10 officer and 27 crew cabins.

Each pair of diesel engines drives a controllable-pitch propeller through a gearbox. There are two rudders, two 900 kW bow thrusters and two Mitsubishi stabilisers.

Service
MV Hrossey operates between Lerwick and Aberdeen, with a call at Kirkwall on some days. A walkway, built specifically for the current vessels, can take both foot and car passengers. She is also able to relieve on the Stromness to Scrabster crossing.

On 3 January 2015. Hrossey discovered the upturned hull of the Cypriot cargo ship  in the Pentland Firth. A search was launched for her eight crew.

References

External links
 NorthLink Ferries - Official Website

NorthLink Ferries
2002 ships
Ships built in Rauma, Finland
Transport in Shetland